The Show Goes On may refer to:

 The Show Goes On (film), a 1937 British musical comedy film
 The Show Goes On (1936 film), or Three Maxims, a British drama directed by Herbert Wilcox
 The Show Goes On (TV series), a 1950–1952 American variety show
 "The Show Goes On" (song), by Lupe Fiasco, 2010
 "The Show Goes On", a song by Bruce Hornsby and the Range from Scenes from the Southside, 1988
 The Show Goes On, a 1997 revue featuring the songs of Harvey Schmidt and Tom Jones

See also
 The show must go on (disambiguation)